Law Breakers is a 1971 French drama film starring Jacques Brel, directed by Marcel Carné. It was entered into the 7th Moscow International Film Festival.

Based on a real-life incident, an idealistic and dedicated magistrate is assigned to examine the case of two policemen and their inspector who have beaten a suspect to death. By the time the case is heard in court, all the witnesses and the widow's counsel have been intimidated into silence, the magistrate himself has come under heavy pressure to drop the case, and the three murderers walk free.

Plot
In Provence just before Christmas, a former prisoner suspected of robbery is dragged from his home by two policemen, taken to the police station, and beaten to death. His widow then files a charge and the case is allocated to the magistrate Bernard Level for judicial investigation. Both the two policemen and the inspector on duty deny any wrongdoing, as does the one other policeman in the station and two men then in custody, all of them claiming that the death was an accident, perhaps a heart attack. The autopsy is explicit however, so Level must either break the false testimony of at least one person in the station or find other witnesses.

His efforts unearth two new witnesses: a prostitute who was in custody at the time but was whisked out of town by the police, and a bartender who served the dead man on his way home for the last time. He recommends prosecution of the two policemen and of the inspector who covers up for them. By the time the case comes to court, all the witnesses and the widow's counsel have been intimidated into silence, while Level himself has come under intense pressure. His son has had marijuana planted on him while his girl friend, an Italian antiques dealer, has been sold a stolen object and faces deportation.

Despite the efforts of the presiding judge to get witnesses to tell the truth, the trial is a foregone conclusion and the three guilty men are acquitted. Level has to rethink his future.

Cast
 Jacques Brel as Le juge d'instruction Bernard Level
 Catherine Rouvel as Danièle Lebegue
 Paola Pitagora as Laura
 Roland Lesaffre as Saugeat
 Boby Lapointe as Louis Casso
 Jean-Roger Caussimon as Le commissaire Lagache
 Henri Nassiet as Le président du tribunal (as Henry Nassiet)
 Harry-Max as Moulard (as Harry Max)
 Pierre Maguelon as Le gardien
 Luc Ponette as Me Rivette
 Marius Laurey as Véricel
 Lucien Barjon as Mauvoisins
 Michael Lonsdale as Inspector Bertrand
 Charles Denner as Graziani
 Katia Tchenko as Graziani's assistant

References

External links
 

1971 films
1971 drama films
1970s French-language films
French drama films
Films directed by Marcel Carné
Films scored by Michel Colombier
Jacques Brel
1970s French films